Andrew Nii Commey Otoo (born June 10, 1996) known by the stage name Mr Drew is a Ghanaian Highlife and Afrobeats musician and dancer. In 2021, he won the Best New Artist award at both Vodafone Ghana Music Awards and 3Music Awards.

Early life and education
Mr Drew was born in Accra in the Greater Accra Region of Ghana. He attended the Achimota Senior High School.

Career
Mr Drew started off as a dancer when he was in senior high school before later switching to become a musician full time. His career officially started when he joined and became the first runner-up at the MTN Hitmaker Season 6 in 2017. After the MTN Hitmaker Mr Drew was signed to Highly Spiritual Music founded my music producer and engineer Kaywa. 

Mr Drew released his debut album in 2021 named ALPHA, the album featured names like Victor AD, Seyi Shay, Kwabena Kwabena, Kelvyn Boy, Raybekah and KiDi.

Discography

Singles
Gimme Love
Simajorley
Agbelemi Feat DopeNation & Incredible Zigi
Dw3 Feat Sarkodie & KRYMI
Dw3 Remix Feat Bosom P Yung, KRYMI, Kofi Mole, DopeNation, Quamina MP & Fameye
Later Feat Kelvyn Boy
Let Me Know
This Year
Mood
Pains
Shuperu Feat KiDi
S3K3 Feat Medikal
Dayana

Album
 Alpha 2021

Track list 

 One by One (feat. Victor AD)
 Falaa
 Some More (Feat. Seyi Shay)
 Fo (Cry) Feat. Kwabena Kwabena
 Good Vibes (feat. Kelvyn boy)
 Party
 Filomina
 Zombie
 Letter (feat. Raybekah)
 Yaayaa
 Somebody's Bae
 Shuperu (feat. KiDi)

Awards and Nominations

References

Ghanaian male singer-songwriters
Living people
1996 births
Alumni of Achimota School
21st-century Ghanaian male singers
21st-century Ghanaian singers
21st-century Ghanaian musicians